A boilermaker is a tradesperson who fabricates steels, iron, or copper into boilers and other large containers intended to hold hot gas or liquid, as well as maintains and repairs boilers and boiler systems.

Although the name originated from craftsmen who made boilers, boilermakers in fact assemble, maintain, and repair other large vessels and closed vats.

The boilermaker trade evolved from industrial blacksmithing; in the early nineteenth century, a boilermaker was called a boilersmith. The involvement of boilermakers in the shipbuilding and engineering industries came about because of the changeover from wood to iron as a construction material. It was often easier, and less expensive, to hire a boilermaker who was already in the shipyard--fabricating iron boilers for wooden steamships--to build a ship. This overlap of skills could extend to anything large and made of iron--or later, steel. In the UK, this effective monopoly over an important skill of the industrial revolution led to boilermakers being labeled 'the labour aristocracy" by historians.

Application
Boilermaking, welding, and fitting tubes can be a full-time requirement at power plants. Stress fractures, leaks, and corrosion demand continual repair or replacement resulting from operation at very high steam pressures. Other boilermakers might work seasonally or on an individual project such as re-fitting a boiler in a seagoing vessel or remodeling a steam plant.

Boiler repair can be a high-value, high-cost service since even the smallest steam boilers for dry cleaners and tailors can cost upwards of $20,000 to replace.

Domestic boilers in the United States of America
In the United States, many boilermakers are employed in repairing, repiping, and re-tubing commercial steam and hot water boilers used for heating and domestic hot water in commercial buildings and multi-family dwellings. Sometimes these boilers are referred to as pressure vessels. Generally, a pressure vessel is a storage tank or vessel that has been designed to operate at pressures above .

The two main responsibilities of boilermakers are the use of oxy-acetylene gas torch sets to cut or gouge steel plate and tubes, followed by gas tungsten arc welding (GTAW), shielded metal arc welding (SMAW), or gas metal arc welding (GMAW) to attach and mend the cut sections of tubes and steel plates.

Training and certification in the United States
Boilermakers usually go through a formal apprenticeship which includes about four years of paid on-the-job training combined with classroom instruction. Unions and many employers offer these apprenticeships. To become an apprentice, one must be at least 18 years old and have a high school diploma or GED. Attending a trade or technical school combined with employer-provided training can accelerate the learning curve.

According to U. S. Census Bureau data of 2012, boilermakers are the most male "saturated" job in the USA, having a share of 99.8 % males and 0.2 % females.

R Stamp Welding
Boiler repair in the United States is governed by the National Board of Boiler and Pressure Vessel Inspectors and the American Society of Mechanical Engineers (ASME) under a classification called R Stamp Welding. In order to perform R Stamp welds and repairs, boilermakers are tested and certified in the quality of their weld joints through a rigorous testing procedure. R stamps are issued to companies that have existing ASME code stamps issued for construction and whose quality control system covers repairs or follow the guidelines set up by ASME to obtain an R stamp. Welders identify their welds by stamping their identifying welder number adjacent to their completed weld with a set of steel stencils.

Power Piping
Welding, fitting, and installing the tubes and accessories that attach to the boiler can also be performed by boilermakers, and is governed by the same organizations as R Stamp Welding. This certification is called Power Piping and is governed by ASME Code section B31.1.

Trade unions

United States and Canada
The International Brotherhood of Boilermakers, Iron Ship Builders, Blacksmiths, Forgers and Helpers is a labor union for boilermakers in Canada and the United States.

UK
In the UK, boilermakers traditionally joined the Boilermakers Society which merged with the General and Municipal Workers' Union (GMWU), then an unskilled union, to form the modern GMB which still maintains a "craft section" largely for boilermakers.

Notable boilermakers and former boilermakers
 Omar Bradley - first Chairman of the Joint Chiefs of Staff
 Richard Carroll - American politician
 Billy Connolly - Scottish comedian
 Dave Charnley - boxer
 Fred Cornish - rugby player
 Horace Elgin Dodge - Dodge Motors founder
 John Francis Dodge - Dodge Motors founder
 Arthur Dooley - artist
 John A. Duffy - American Roman Catholic bishop
 Todd Graves - fast food entrepreneur
 John Hill - trade unionist
 Ted Hill - British politician
 James J. Jeffries (The Boilermaker) - American champion heavyweight boxer
 John MacDougall - British politician
 Duncan McNeil - British politician
 David Morehouse - CEO of the Pittsburgh Penguins National Hockey League team
 Harry Pollitt - British communist politician
 George Sage - British footballer
 Alfred Short - British politician
 Barry Williams - British trade union official
 Billy Williams - British rugby player
 David Williams - British politician
 Thomas Wilson - American industrialist

References

Boilermakers
Construction trades workers
Metalworking occupations